The Moltke was a three-masted barque built in Hamburg, Germany in 1870. The vessel was wrecked off the coast of northern Queensland, Australia in 1890 before being refloated and hulked. In 1911 the vessel was scuttled off Geoffrey Bay, Magnetic Island. The wreck of the vessel now hosts a wide range of underwater life and is a popular open-water dive site.

History
Built by Godeffroy-Zeit in Hamburg, Germany in 1870 for the company Fritze & Gerdes, the Moltke was a three-masted, iron hulled,  barque. The vessel sailed from Germany to Townsville, Australia in 1890 and was described as "beautiful, spotlessly clean and expensively furnished.". Having docked at Townsville to unload cargo and passengers the vessel continued onto Rockhampton. On 1891-04-03, en route to Rockhampton, at the northern end of the Flinders Channel to the east of Cape Bowling Green, the vessel ran aground upon a reef. The crew abandoned the vessel and returned to Townsville.

The contents and cargo of the vessel were then sold at a profit, with the vessel returning to service with Burns, Philp and Company Limited used as a coal hulk. In 1911, Dr McCabe, a local dentist who owned property at Geoffrey Bay purchased the hulk with the intent to scuttle the vessel to protect the jetty located in the bay. An explosives expert, William Bright, was contracted to sink the vessel. Accounts of the event suggest that while the vessel was being towed into place, the fuse for the explosives was lit prematurely by an intoxicated Bright. The tug boat pilot was able to release the tow lines and pilot clear of the vessel. However, the explosives aboard the vessel detonated and scuttled the boat in the wrong location and 10m depth.

References

Shipwrecks of Magnetic Island
Ships built in Hamburg
1870 ships
Maritime incidents in 1911
1911 in Australia
1871–1900 ships of Australia
Colliers of Australia
Coal hulks
Merchant ships of Australia
Passenger ships of Australia
Barques of Australia